New York City's 30th City Council district is one of 51 districts in the New York City Council. It has been represented by Democrat Robert Holden since 2018, following his defeat of fellow Democrat Elizabeth Crowley; though a Democrat, Holden first won the seat running as the Republican nominee. Holden won the seat again in 2021 as the Democratic, Republican and Conservative nominee; he received the most votes on the Republican ballot line.

Geography
District 30 is based in the predominantly white neighborhoods of central Queens, including Maspeth, Glendale, Middle Village, and parts of Woodhaven, Ridgewood, and Woodside. Forest Park is located within the district, as are a number of the city's cemeteries.

The district overlaps with Queens Community Boards 2, 5, 6, and 9, and with New York's 6th, 7th, 12th, and 14th congressional districts. It also overlaps with the 12th, 15th, and 16th districts of the New York State Senate, and with the 28th, 30th, 34th, 37th, 38th, and 39th districts of the New York State Assembly.

Recent election results

2021

In 2019, voters in New York City approved Ballot Question 1, which implemented ranked-choice voting in all local elections. Under the new system, voters have the option to rank up to five candidates for every local office. Voters whose first-choice candidates fare poorly will have their votes redistributed to other candidates in their ranking until one candidate surpasses the 50 percent threshold. If one candidate surpasses 50 percent in first-choice votes, then ranked-choice tabulations will not occur.

2017

2013

References

New York City Council districts